Morgan Smyth (born February 10, 1986) is an American cross-country skier who has competed since 2002. She won the 5 km qualification event at the FIS Nordic World Ski Championships 2009 in Liberec, Czech Republic. This allowed her to compete in the 10 km event the following day where she finished 51st.

Smyth best World Cup finish was 17th in the team sprint at Whistler Olympic Park, Canada in January 2009. She also had her best individual finish of 25th in the individual sprint at that same event. Morgan also helped the Wildcats complete their historic double podium sweep at the 2007 NCAA Skiing Championships and became the 2016 NMU Sports Hall of Fame Inductee

Smyth in a graduate of Northern Michigan University.

Cross-country skiing results
All results are sourced from the International Ski Federation (FIS).

World Championships

World Cup

Season standings

References

External links

1986 births
American female cross-country skiers
Living people
Northern Michigan University alumni
21st-century American women